Baidu Browser is a WebKit and Trident web browser developed by Baidu for Personal Computers and mobile phones. The Windows version of Baidu Browser contains a feature for proxy requests to certain websites, which permits access to some websites that are normally blocked in China, it also leaks search terms, hard drive serial number, network MAC address, as well as the title of all visited webpages. GPU model number is also transmitted. It had a built in adblocker, torrent and video downloader. The PC edition was discontinued in May 2019, and on 29 September 2019 the basic functions, e.g. webpage browsing were terminated.

References

External links 

 https://mobile.baidu.com/item?pid=3260673475

Windows web browsers